A birbynė is a Lithuanian aerophone that can be either single or double-reeded and may or may not have a mouthpiece. Birbynė can be made of a variety of materials: wood, bark, horn, straw, goose feather, etc. The earliest and simplest examples were used by children as playtoys and by shepherds as a tool to control the herd. In the 19th century, influenced by classical instruments and especially the clarinet, the birbynė evolved into a serious musical instrument used in ensembles. Modern birbynės are made of wood with bells of horn and usually have ten tone holes. They are divided by pitch range into three categories: soprano, tenor, and contrabass.

See also 
 Ganurags
 Zhaleika
 Erkencho
 Shofar

References

Reed aerophones
Lithuanian musical instruments